Donald Neil Bersoff (born March 1, 1939) is an American psychologist, attorney and academic. He was the president of the American Psychological Association (APA) in 2013. Before being elected president, Bersoff served as APA general counsel and held several leadership positions within the organization. He has been a faculty member at several law schools and he developed the nation's second joint graduate program in psychology and law. Bersoff has written four editions of a popular book on ethics and psychology.

Biography

Career
Donald Bersoff earned BS, MA and Ph.D degrees from New York University, completing the PhD in 1965. He practiced clinical psychology for several years in the United States Air Force, in private practice and as director of a college counseling center. He was a psychology professor at Ohio State University and the University of Georgia. In 1976, Bersoff graduated from Yale Law School and joined the law school faculties at the University of Maryland and Johns Hopkins University. He led a joint PhD/JD program in psychology and law at Johns Hopkins. From 1979 to 1989, Bersoff provided legal counsel to the APA, first as in-house general counsel and then through the firms of Jenner and Block and Ennis, Friedman and Bersoff. In 1990, he became director of the psychology and law program at Villanova University, where he is now an emeritus professor of law.

Bersoff was elected president of the APA in 2013, and he is the first lawyer practitioner to hold the office. He served three terms on the APA Council of Representatives. Bersoff is a past president of the American Psychology-Law Society, a division of the APA, and was also chair of the Law and Mental Disability Section of the Association of American Law Schools. He has written more than 100 publications and has authored all four editions of Ethical Conflicts in Psychology. As APA president, he created the Bersoff Presidential Award to Multicultural Programs to recognize psychology graduate programs that recruit and train ethnic minorities.

Honors and awards
Presidential Citation for Distinguished Service, American Psychological Association
Lifetime Contribution Award, American Psychology-Law Society
Ethics Educator of the Year, Pennsylvania Psychological Association

Publications
Ethical Conflicts in Psychology (4th ed.). American Psychological Association (2008)

See also
Legal psychology

References

American lawyers
Presidents of the American Psychological Association
1939 births
Living people
New York University alumni
Yale Law School alumni
Drexel University faculty
Villanova University faculty
Ohio State University faculty
University of Georgia faculty
University of Maryland, College Park faculty
Johns Hopkins University faculty